The Black Reel Award for Television for Outstanding Directing, Drama Series is an American annual award presented to the best directing of a television drama series for a particular episode.

2010s

2020s

Programs with multiple awards

2 awards
 This Is Us

Programs with multiple nominations

6 nominations 
 This Is Us

4 nominations
 Queen Sugar

3 nominations
 Pose

2 nominations
 Black Lightning
 Scandal

Total awards by network
 NBC – 2
 FX - 1
 HBO - 1
 Netflix - 1
 Showtime - 1

Individuals with multiple awards

2 awards
 George Tillman Jr.

Individuals with multiple nominations

3 nominations 
 Kevin Hooks

2 nominations 
 Salim Akil
 Rick Famuyiwa
 Clark Johnson
 Janet Mock
 George Tillman Jr.

References

Black Reel Awards